Muwahid Sesay (born 15 June 1984 in Freetown) is a Sierra Leonean international footballer who plays as a striker for Ports Authority F.C. in the Sierra Leone National Premier League.

Career 
Sesay started his professional footballing career with Sierra Leone National Premier League side Ports Authority in 2002. He was the top scorer in the Sierra Leone National Premier League in the 2003-2004 and 2004-2005 seasons. After five seasons with Ports Authority, Sesay signed for Finnish club Atlantis FC in early 2007. He was recommended to Atlantis FC by his friend and fellow Sierra Leonean international striker, Obi Metzger and signed in November 2009 for PP-70.

International career 
After an impressive campaign for Ports Authority in 2002, he was capped for the Leone Stars in the 2004 African Nations Cup qualifier against Gabon. Sesay made his first appearance when he came on in the second half and caused the Gabonese defenders problems with his strength and pace.

External links 
Sesay on Atlantis FC's website

1984 births
Living people
Sierra Leonean footballers
Sportspeople from Freetown
Atlantis FC players
Ports Authority F.C. players
Association football forwards
Sierra Leone international footballers